Giuseppe Antonio Avitrano (Naples, c. 1670 – Naples, 19 March 1756) was an Italian composer and violinist.

Avitrano came from a family of musicians. From about 1690 until his death he was  member of the Neapolitan court orchestra.

Works
 10 Sonatas for 2 violins, violone, organ, Op. 1 (Naples, 1697)
 10 Sonatas for 2 violins, violone, organ, Op. 2 (Naples, 1703)
 12 Sonata a quattro, for 3 violins and basso continuo, Op. 3 (Naples, 1713) 
 7 cantatas for soprano and basso continuo
 Mariam Laudamus Te, for voices (SSATTB), 2 oboes, 3 violins and basso continuo (Naples, 1746)
 Missa defunctorum (Naples, 1721)

References

1670s births
1756 deaths
Italian Baroque composers
Italian male classical composers
Musicians from Naples
18th-century Italian composers
18th-century Italian male musicians